John Clang, born Ang Choon Leng, is a Singaporean visual artist, photographer and independent filmmaker. His work has been exhibited in galleries and museums worldwide. National Museum of Singapore and Singapore Art Museum acquired his artwork as part of their permanent collection. Clang currently lives and works in Singapore and New York.

In 2018, his first feature film, Their Remaining Journey, had its world premiere at the International Film Festival Rotterdam, and was nominated for the Bright Future Award. It is also the opening film for Painting with Light: Festival of International Films on Art at National Gallery Singapore.

Early years
Clang was born Ang Choon Leng (汪春龙) in Singapore. He earned his nickname while in National Service in Singapore as his badge read "C L Ang". At the age of 17, he enrolled in Lasalle College of the Arts in Singapore to study fine arts but left after six months to assist the fine-art photographer Chua Soo Bin, who received the Cultural Medallion in 1988.

Work
Clang's work explores the commonplaces, mundane subject matters and common nuances that closely relate to our daily life. His work portrays his fascination with time, space and how one negotiates the human existence with these dimensions.

The Land of My Heart (2014) is a series of work which re-appropriates the icon of the Singapore Girl, Singapore Airlines' air stewardess, to contemplate vestiges of identity and personal memories encapsulated in nostalgic spaces of a rapidly evolving motherland.

Being Together (2010–2012) is a series of family portraits using Skype VoIP (voice over Internet Protocol) technology to do live recording of family members and project them across continents.

Clang started on the series by photographing his own family in 2010. From 2010 to 2012, he located Singaporeans around the world and travelled to cities such as London, Paris, Hong Kong, Shanghai, Los Angeles and Seattle to photograph them with their families in Singapore. These 40 family portraits were part of a showcase of over 90 works by Clang exhibited at the National Museum of Singapore in January 2013, together with more than 40 historical family portraits from the museum's collection.

Time (2009) is a series that involves recording a location, to show the passing of time in a montage style.

Exhibitions

Selected solo exhibitions
2001 Backs, DVF studio, New York City
2003 They Were in Color: 4 June 2001 – 27 January 2002, Galerie Colette, Paris, France
2003  Fear of Losing the Existence, Bank Art Gallery, Los Angeles, USA
2004  Clang. A Self Portrait, Jendela Gallery/The Esplanade, Singapore
2007 Clang: A White Book, The Substation, Singapore
2010 Con(Front), 2902 Gallery, Singapore
2012 John Clang: Self Reflection,  Pékin Fine Arts, Beijing, China
2013 Being Together: Family & Portraits – Photographing with John Clang, National Museum of Singapore, Singapore
2013 When I say you are dreaming, so am I, 2902 Gallery, Art Stage Singapore, Singapore
2014 (Re)Contextualizing My Mind, Pékin Fine Arts, Hong Kong.
2016 The World Surrounding an Indoor Plant, FOST Gallery, Gillman Barracks, Singapore

Selected group exhibitions
1993 Critical Framework, 5th Passage Gallery, Singapore
2002 Porn?, Proud Galleries, London, UK
2002 Fascination, Singapore Art Museum, Singapore
2009 (super)natural, The Tobacco Warehouse, Brooklyn, New York City
2009 TransportAsian, Singapore Art Museum, Singapore
2010 Through the Looking Glass, Annexe Gallery, Kuala Lumpur, Malaysia
2010 Through the Looking Glass, 2902 Gallery, Singapore
2010 HIDEntities, mc2gallery, Milan, Italy
2010 2nd Dali International Photography Festival, Human : Nature, Dali, Yunan, China
2010 Human Faces, National Museum of Singapore, Singapore
2010 The 2010 Sovereign Asian Art Prize, Artspace@Helutrans, Singapore
2011 The Open Daybook Exhibition, Los Angeles Contemporary Exhibitions (LACE), Los Angeles, USA
2011 ANGSANA: Southeast Asian Photographers Taking Flight, 2902 Gallery, Singapore
2011  The 2010 Sovereign Asian Art Prize, The Rotunda, Exchange Square, Hong Kong
2011 NOW or NEVER, ION Art Gallery, Singapore
2011 What's Next 30 x 30 Creative Exhibition, The OCT Art & Design Gallery, Shenzhen, China
2011 What's Next 30 x 30 Creative Exhibition, ArtisTree, Hong Kong
2011 Not Too Far Away, 2902 Gallery, Singapore
2012 The 2011 Sovereign Asian Art Prize, The Sands Expo and Convention Center, Singapore
2012 Crossing SEA(s), 2902 Gallery, Singapore
2012 I See China, Pékin Fine Arts, Beijing, China
2012 Paper Moon, KSU Art Museum, Kennesaw, USA
2012 Venti d'Oriente, mc2gallery, Milan, Italy
2012 W I T H ( O U T ), Brockspace, London, UK 
2013 Zoological, 2902 Gallery, Singapore 
2013 Ghost, Sculpture Square, Singapore
2014  Family Matters, Centre for Contemporary Culture Strozzina, Florence, Italy
2014 Anthropos New York, Sundaram Tagore, New York City
2014 Afterimage: Contemporary Photography from Southeast Asia, Singapore Art Museum, Singapore
2014 Asuntos domésticos,  Sala exposiciones Diputación de Huesca, Spain 
2014 War Room, Pékin Fine Arts Hong Kong 
2017 The Poetics of Absence, 1X1 Art Gallery, Dubai 
2018 Singapore Unseen, Pera Museum, Istanbul

Awards
On 19 November 2010, John Clang became the first photographer in Singapore to receive the Designer of the Year award at the annual President's Design Award, the most prestigious design accolade in Singapore.

References

External links
 John Clang's website
 John Clang at FOST Gallery
 John Clang at Pékin Fine Arts
 John Clang at SUPERVISION

1973 births
Living people
Fine art photographers
Singaporean artists
Singaporean people of Chinese descent
Singaporean photographers
Singaporean film directors
Singaporean expatriates in the United States
Artists from New York City
Conceptual photographers